The 1904 United States presidential election in New York took place on November 8, 1904. All contemporary 45 states were part of the 1904 United States presidential election. Voters chose 39 electors to the Electoral College, who selected the president and vice president.

New York was the home state of both major party nominees, Republican nominee, incumbent President Theodore Roosevelt and Democratic nominee, Chief Judge of the New York Court of Appeals Alton B. Parker. The Empire State was won by Roosevelt and his running mate Charles W. Fairbanks of Indiana, defeating Parker and his running mate Senator Henry G. Davis of West Virginia. Also in the running was the Socialist Party candidate, Eugene V. Debs, who ran with Ben Hanford.

Roosevelt carried New York with 53.13% of the vote to Parker’s 42.28%, a victory margin of 10.85%. Debs finished a distant third, receiving 2.28% of the vote in the state. 

While New York would continue its Republican dominance of the Fourth Party System, with the Empire State being the home state of both major party candidates in 1904, the state’s results were relatively close despite Roosevelt’s nationwide landslide. The state was about 8 points more Democratic than the national average primarily due to Alton Parker’s popularity in the New York City area, with Parker winning majorities in Manhattan, The Bronx, and Queens, and winning a plurality on Staten Island.

Results

Results by county

See also
 United States presidential elections in New York
 Presidency of Theodore Roosevelt

References

New York
1904
1904 New York (state) elections